Semana Musical Llao Llao is a classical music festival in Argentina. The festival was created in 1993 and is held at the Llao Llao Hotel, near Bariloche. The Festival breaks through the Argentine tradition, and brings classical music to the foothills of the Andes. The festival is held yearly in October.

Past Performers
Martha Argerich
Yousuko Horigome
la Orquesta Sinfónica Nacional
Luis Ascot
Tommy Tichauer
Guelfo Nally
University of La Plata Quartet
Alejandro Drago 
Rafael Gintoli
Paula Peluso
Eduardo Hubert 
São Paulo Quartet
Tartini Chord Quartet
Akiko Ebi
Ástor Piazzolla Foundation Quintet

See also
List of classical music festivals in South America
List of music festivals in Argentina

External links
  Semana Musical
 Llao Llao Hotel & Resort

Classical music festivals in Argentina
Music festivals in Argentina
1993 establishments in Argentina
Music festivals established in 1993
Spring (season) events in Argentina
Bariloche